The James W. Alcorn House, in Stanford, Kentucky, was built in 1885.  It was listed on the National Register of Historic Places in 1980.

It is located at 409 Danville Ave. in Stanford.  The listing included six contributing buildings.

It is a two-story, brick T-plan house.  Five frame outbuildings are included in the listing.  It has also been known as The Hickories at St. Asaph's.

The house was home of James W. Alcorn, who served as a Confederate officer in the American Civil War and who later "gained regional recognition as a successful attorney during the latter half of the 1800s."

References

		
National Register of Historic Places in Lincoln County, Kentucky
Houses completed in 1885
Houses in Lincoln County, Kentucky
1885 establishments in Kentucky
Stanford, Kentucky